Extremism in America is the title of the following publications:

 Extremism in America (Anti-Defamation League), an encyclopedic online resource by the Anti-Defamation League.
 Extremism in America, a book edited by George Michael.
 Extremism in America: A Reader, a book by Lyman Tower Sargent.